Celia Isabel Gauna Ruiz (born 19 November 1964) is a Mexican politician affiliated with the PRI. She currently serves as Deputy of the LXII Legislature of the Mexican Congress representing Jalisco.

References

1964 births
Living people
Politicians from Guadalajara, Jalisco
Women members of the Chamber of Deputies (Mexico)
Mexican architects
Institutional Revolutionary Party politicians
21st-century Mexican politicians
21st-century Mexican women politicians
Deputies of the LXII Legislature of Mexico
Members of the Chamber of Deputies (Mexico) for Jalisco